Vivien Assie Koua (Arabic: فيفيان آسي كوا) (born 30 December 1992) is an Ivorian footballer who plays for AS Vita Club.

References

External links
 

Ivorian footballers
1992 births
Living people
Association football defenders
AS Denguélé players
CO Transports players
Stade Tunisien players
Al Kharaitiyat SC players
Al-Arabi SC (Qatar) players
MC Oran players
Kazma SC players
AS Vita Club players
Qatar Stars League players
Algerian Ligue Professionnelle 1 players
Kuwait Premier League players
Expatriate footballers in Tunisia
Expatriate footballers in Qatar
Expatriate footballers in Algeria
Expatriate footballers in Kuwait
Ivorian expatriate sportspeople in Tunisia
Ivorian expatriate sportspeople in Qatar
Ivorian expatriate sportspeople in Algeria
Ivorian expatriate sportspeople in Kuwait